Robert Harwood (20 November 1923 – 23 November 1992) was a New Zealand cricketer. He played five first-class matches for Otago between 1944 and 1946.

See also
 List of Otago representative cricketers

References

External links
 

1923 births
1992 deaths
New Zealand cricketers
Otago cricketers
Cricketers from Dunedin